Imogen Rhia Herrad is a German historian, translator, writer and broadcaster. She was born in 1967 and brought up in Germany, she has also lived in Wales, London and in Argentina. She has learnt Welsh and  writes in both German and English.

Her short stories and articles in English have been published in magazines and anthologies in Wales, Canada and the US. Her programmes for German public radio (in German) include pieces about the medieval countess Matilda of Canossa, the Antichrist, Zora Neale Hurston, the Mapuche people of Patagonia, and the cultural histories of sheep, dragons  and the apple, respectively.

Herrad’s story The Accident has been longlisted for the Raymond Carver Short Story Awards. Her children’s story  The Wind’s Bride won third prize in the London Writers’ Competition. Her novel 'Caratacus' Daughter', set in first-century Iron Age Britain and Ancient Rome, received a grant from Academi, the Welsh literature promotion agency.

Her travel narrative "Beyond the Pampas: in Search of Patagonia" was published in November 2012.

She is currently working on a mystery novel about a murder in a gladiator re-enactment group set in Cardiff and Caerleon.
 
Her B.A. dissertation about gender deviance in ancient Ancient Rome, "Quis satis vir est?" ("Who is man enough?") won the 2014 Gender Studies Prize  of the University of Bonn.

Herrad works as translator and academic editor at the Bonn Center for Dependency and Slavery Studies. She is engaged on a PhD thesis about disobedience in public space in ancient Sparta and teaches ancient history at the University of Bonn.

Works
"Transgression und Devianz in der antiken Welt" (Co-edited with Lennart Gilhaus, Michael Meurer and Anja Pfeiffer) J.B. Metzler (2020) 
"Beyond the Pampas: in Search of Patagonia" (Travel) Seren Books (2012) 
"Rhiannon's Bird", short story in: Sing Sorrow Sorrow, Seren Books (2010)
"Without a Trace", short story in: Written in Blood, Honno (2009) 
The Woman who loved an Octopus and other Saints' Tales (short stories) Seren Books 2007 
"Hortus Conclusus", short story in: Coming up Roses, Honno (2008) 
"The Accident", short story in: Safe World Gone, Honno (2007) 
"Ym Mhatagonia" (In Patagonia), travel writing in: Even the Rain is Different, Honno (2004) 
"Bronwerdd", short story in: The Woman who loved Cucumbers, Honno (2002)

References

External links
Imogen Herrad website

1967 births
Living people
German children's writers
German women children's writers
German women short story writers
German short story writers
21st-century German writers
21st-century German women writers